The State Statistics Committee of Azerbaijan Republic is a governmental agency within the Cabinet of Azerbaijan in charge of collection, processing and disseminating statistical data on the economy, demographics and other sectors of activity in Azerbaijan Republic. The agency is headed by Arif Valiyev.

History
The statistics offices were initially created and operated in Shamakhi from 1846 through 1859, in Baku from 1859 and in Ganja from 1867 after their incorporation into Russian governorates. Until 1917, statistical data was given in 20 to 27 tables and contained information on population, labor, job markets, number of factories and plants, agricultural data, prices on commodities, military data, etc. 
With the establishment of the Azerbaijan Democratic Republic, the authorities tried to create a centralized office for statistical data collection but succeeded only in establishment of separate statistics offices within various ministries such as within State Property Ministry on November 15, 1918, and within the Department of Land of the Ministry of Agriculture in July 1919.
After establishment of Soviet rule on July 8, 1920 Nariman Narimanov created an interim collegium of statistics within the Azerbaijan Revolutionary Committee. From 1924 forward, regional statistical bodies were created in each region.
In 1928, a new statute was approved by the Council of People's Commissars of Azerbaijan SSR for creation of Central Statistics Department. In 1948, the Central Statistics Department was transferred to the Cabinet of Ministers of Azerbaijan. 
In 1987, the Central Statistics Department was transformed into State Statistics Committee of Azerbaijan SSR and its statute was approved by the Council of Ministers of March 1988. 
On February 18, 1994 President of independent Azerbaijan, Heydar Aliyev signed the Law on Statistics establishing the State Statistics Committee of Azerbaijan Republic.

Structure
The committee is headed by its chairman. It consists of the Central Administration, State Statistics Committee of Nakhichevan AR, Baku City Statistics Department, 81 raion statistics offices, Main Accounting Office and Department for Scientific Research and Projection of Statistical Data.
The State Statistical Committee of the Republic of Azerbaijan ensures the activity of the statistical information system on the basis of the single methodology in the social and economic spheres in the country. The State Statistical Committee of Azerbaijan is an independent central economic body regulating the statistical and registration activity and operating in the system of the central executive bodies. 
The committee carries out its activities on the basis of the comprehensive and objective study of socioeconomic processes taking place in the country, provides the information on the socioeconomic state of the country and is responsible for the implementation of the policy, aiming at the increase of the role of statistical information through respecting the rights of individuals and legal enterprises and protecting their privacies. Main functions of the committee are ensuring the objectiveness of the statistical information and its correspondence to the processes occurring in the social and economic spheres in the period of transmission to market economy; retaining control over development and application of technical and economic information; analysis of statistical information, calculation of socioeconomic and demographic balance and subsequent forecasting; maintaining international cooperation in the sphere of statistics, spreading and exchanging statistical information not contradicting the interests of the country; provision of government bodies of the Republic of Azerbaijan with the statistical materials reflecting the socioeconomic state in the country; arranging the collection of necessary statistical information on the basis of the state statistical calculation, conducting the application of optional observations along with statistical ones; ensuring the confidentiality of the state and commercial secrets and the statistical information, etc.

Rights of the Statistical Committee of Azerbaijan Republic 
The SSC of Azerbaijan carries out its duties based on the rights determined by the Constitution of the Republic of Azerbaijan and other related entities. These rights include;

 Preparing or to participate in the preparation of drafts of legislative acts that are related to  the statistical field;
 Gathering detailed and dependable statistical information in a determined way, volume and period  without charge from legal bodies, executive entities, (including their representatives and affiliations) legal entities of the country located outside of borders of Azerbaijan or the representatives of foreign legal bodies and their affiliations that acting within the borders of the Republic of Azerbaijan, including natural persons or ordinal citizens of Azerbaijan Republic based on a defined way by the SSC of Azerbaijan.
 Ensuring that the Republic of Azerbaijan support international treaties in the statistical field;
 Working jointly with the related international organizations of different foreign countries in a defined way by the state legislature;
 Detecting distorted data and provide mandatory instructions to the corresponding legal entities (their representative offices and affiliates) for implementing these adjustments in relevant reports and documents and requesting information and references from them related to the problem;
 Regulating works on the approval and development of forms related to statistics report formats, determining their collection periods and rules and eliminating the official statistical reports that have already lost their significance;
 Based on the signed agreements, it provides statistical services (not existing in the programs related to the works in the field of statistics) to be paid the fee to the state budget to legal entities and natural persons;
 Coordinating the selling process of the produced statistical materials and additional materials which is not considered in the program of statistical works to users, except executive, legislative and court authorities, mass media, in defined way and by paying the fee to state budget;
 Obtaining necessary information from the central executive bodies, which is the state register of legal entities (their representatives and branches) and individual entrepreneurs, for the preparation and conducting of the state register of statistical units;
 Publishing information on the results of the socio-economic, demographic and environmental situation in the Republic of Azerbaijan, solve methodological issues in the field of statistics and suggest recommendations according to the activity directions;
 Choosing the source and method of data collection for performing work in the field of statistics, determine the form and time of its distribution;
 Involving independent experts and specialists in their activities in the manner prescribed by the law;
 Using statistical information about the database of the relevant executive authorities on the basis of the concluded agreement;
 Making decisions to be realized by the legal entities and natural persons in the sphere of organizing statistical works, relevant to authorities;
 Applying administrative reproach measures on persons who goes against the rules of presenting statistical data within the framework of authorities and spreading statistical secrets that determined by legislation;
 Exercising other rights provided by the legislation of the Republic of Azerbaijan.

Statistical Council 
The Statistical Council which works under the State Statistics Committee of the Republic of Azerbaijan (hereinafter referred to as the council) was established to prepare and carry out programs in this area, as well as in relevant organizations. The council is also accountable for development in related organizations and advising statistical bodies.

The council is guided by;

 The Constitution of the Republic of Azerbaijan
 Laws of the Republic of Azerbaijan
 Decrees and orders of the president of the Republic of Azerbaijan
 Resolutions and orders of the Government of the Republic of Azerbaijan
 The Law of the Republic of Azerbaijan on Official Statistics
 The Regulations on the State Statistics Committee of the Republic of Azerbaijan and the present Statute.

International Relations 
SSC of Azerbaijan collaborate with the statistical agencies of various countries such as Kazakhstan, Turkey, Tajikistan, Russia, Moldova, etc. Moreover, the committee collaborate has developed relations with UN Statistics Division, CIS Intergovernmental Statistical Committee, WB, IMF UNESCO, EC, BSEC and statistical organs from more than 40 countries all around the world.

See also
Cabinet of Azerbaijan

References

Azerbaijan
Government agencies of Azerbaijan
Government agencies established in 1994
1994 establishments in Azerbaijan